The São João River is a tributary of the Ji-Paraná River in Rondônia state, western Brazil.

See also
List of rivers of Rondônia

References
Brazilian Ministry of Transport

Rivers of Rondônia